George Paulus (April 23, 1948 in Chicago, Illinois, United States – November 15, 2014 in Downers Grove, Illinois) was an American record producer, plus the founder and owner of Barrelhouse Records, Negro Rhythm Records, and St. George Records.

External links
St. George Records official website
Illustrated Barrelhouse Records discography
Illustrated St. George Records discography
Living Blues, #240

1948 births
2014 deaths
Record producers from Illinois